The 2006 Barnsley Metropolitan Borough Council election took place on 4 May 2006 to elect members of Barnsley Metropolitan Borough Council in South Yorkshire, England. One third of the council was up for election, with an extra vacancy in Penistone East caused by a resignation, and the Labour party stayed in overall control of the council.

Background
The Barnsley Independent Group, which had been formed by independents on the council, were contesting an election for the first time. They put up candidates in 17 of the 21 wards which had seats up for election and 7 of their councillors were defending seats.

Election result
The results saw Labour stay in control of the council, making a net gain of 1 to hold 34 seats.

This resulted in the following composition of the council:

Ward results
+/- figures represent changes from the last time these wards were contested.

By-elections between 2006 and 2007

References

2006 English local elections
2006
2000s in South Yorkshire